Restless Records is a record label that was started in El Segundo, California in 1986 by Enigma Records and primarily released alternative, metal, and punk records. Restless also licensed and released records from Bar/None Records, Metal Blade Records and Mute Records. Restless also had a fully owned subsidiary, Pink Dust Records.

In 1991 Restless and a number of Enigma Records titles were acquired by Bill Hein and Joe Regis and re-launched in Hollywood, California. In 1992, Restless acquired the Twin/Tone Records label and classic titles by such artists as The Replacements, Soul Asylum, The Jayhawks and Ween. This added to Restless' already substantial catalogue of titles by They Might Be Giants, The Cramps, The Dead Milkmen, Devo, The Flaming Lips, Stiff Little Fingers, T.S.O.L. among others.

In 1993 Restless co-founded Alternative Distribution Alliance (ADA) with Warner Brothers Music Group (WMG) to handle its distribution and certain titles released by Warner Bros., Elektra Records, Atlantic Records, their affiliates and Sub Pop Records. Sub Pop subsequently became a partner in the venture. Within 10 years, ADA went on to become the largest distributor of independent music in America.

In 1997 Restless was acquired by Arnon Milchan's New Regency Productions, one of the entertainment industry's largest independent film production companies. Restless remained a subsidiary of New Regency until 2001, during which time, Restless released many of New Regency's soundtracks including L.A. Confidential, Fight Club and Malcolm In The Middle (the title song to which earned They Might Be Giants a Grammy in 2001).

After New Regency sold its interest back to Hein and Regis in 2001 Restless entered into a distribution deal with Ryko Distribution which led to a sale to Ryko Corp. Ryko was later acquired by Warner Music Group in 2006. Since then, some of the albums originally released under Restless went out of print, referred to by They Might Be Giants in their newsletter as "the almost instant collapse of Restless Records after the events of 9/11."

Artists

 45 Grave
 Adrenalin O.D.
 Agent Orange
 AMiniature
 Aversion
 The Bags
 Band of Susans
 Beowulf
 Tim Buckley
 Butchering The Beatles
 Lori Carson
 Cinderblock
 Cirith Ungol
 Danzig
 Dead Milkmen
 Death Angel
 Doughboys
 Dream Syndicate
 Econoline Crush
 Electric Love Muffin
 Elvis Hitler
 Roky Erikson
 The Fibonaccis
 FLAK
 The Flaming Lips
 Forgotten Rebels
 Get Smart!
 Russ Tolman
 Giant Sand
 Crispin Glover
 The Golden Palominos
 Green on Red
 Hellion
 Indestroy
 IronChrist
 Jailhouse
 Jessica Betts
The Jet Black Berries
 The Johnsons
 Little Caesar
 Mazzy Star
 Michael Sweet
 The Moog Cookbook
 The Neighborhoods
 Nova Mob
 Old Skull
 The Outlets
 Pajama Slave Dancers
 The Pandoras
 Perfect
 Punchbuggy
 Radar Bros.
 The Shivers
 Social Distortion
 Spain
 Suncatcher
 Terrance Simien and the Mallet Playboys
 Straw Dogs (formerly The F.U.'s)
 They Might Be Giants
 T.S.O.L.
Top Jimmy & The Rhythm Pigs
 The Vandals
 Wall of Voodoo
 Warren G
 Ween
 Wipers/Greg Sage
 YMO
 You Am I
 The Zeros

See also
 List of record labels

References

Punk record labels
American independent record labels
Alternative rock record labels
Record labels based in California
Record labels established in 1986
Record labels disestablished in 2001
1986 establishments in California
2001 disestablishments in California
Defunct companies based in Greater Los Angeles